Adetaptera lenticula is a species of beetle in the family Cerambycidae. It was described by Galileo & Martins in 2006.

References

Apomecynini
Beetles described in 2006